John Patterson Sampson, D. D. (1837-1928) (also known as "J. P. Sampson") was an American abolitionist, newspaper publisher, judge, and minister.

He was born free to James Drawhorn Sampson and Fanny (Kellogg) Sampson on August 13, 1837 (or 1838) in Wilmington, North Carolina. His grandparents were Drawhorn and Susan Sampson and Manerva (Green) Kellogg, and he had two brothers, Benjamin and Joseph. James, who had both Scottish and African ancestry, was born a slave, and became a successful carpenter after being freed, establishing his family's prominence in the state.

He graduated from Comer's College in Boston, Massachusetts in 1856 after which he taught in New York, and soon launched a newspaper, The Colored Citizen, in Cincinnati, Ohio. The Colored Citizen was oriented toward black soldiers in the American Civil War, and enjoyed strong Christian support. He earned a law degree from the National University School of Law in 1873. He served in several local government offices, and then served for 40 years as a Methodist minister.

He published the book Mixed Races: Their Environment, Temperament, Heredity, and Phrenology in 1881.

References 

1837 births
1928 deaths